Rasoi Show is the longest running Indian television cookery show broadcast on Colors Gujarati channel since 25 October 2004. The show currently holds the record for being the cooking-show which has aired the second most number of episodes, trailing only the Mexican series Hasta La Cocina. The show is currently hosted by Mittal Shah and Hely Panchal. The series is one of the longest running shows in India as well as Asia. In 2023, the show successfully completed 6,000 episodes.

Format
The show invites guests from across the Indian state of Gujarat, who show the viewers how to prepare their invented dishes; as well as how already existing dishes could be made more tastier, healthier, and cheaper to produce. The guests, which are celebrities or volunteers, create not only Indian food, but cuisines from all over the world. Special dishes are prepared to suit festivals such as Diwali, Holi, Eid and Christmas.

Broadcasting
Rasoi Show is broadcast daily on Colors Gujarati channel at 2:00 pm IST, since 25 October 2004. It runs for an hour from Monday to Saturday. The repeat telecasts are aired at 3:00AM the same day and 10:00AM the following day.

References

External links
 Official website

2010s Indian television series
2005 Indian television series debuts
Indian cooking television series
Colors Gujarati original programming
Gujarati-language television shows